Saudi Arabia participated in the 2006 Asian Games, held in Doha, Qatar from 1 to 15 December 2006. Saudi Arabia ranked 13th with 8 gold medals.

Medalists

References

Nations at the 2006 Asian Games
2006
Asian Games